The 2009 Limerick Senior Hurling Championship was the 115th staging of the Limerick Senior Hurling Championship since its establishment by the Limerick County Board in 1887.

Adare were the defending champions.

On 17 October 2009, Adare won the championship after a 1-17 to 0-03 defeat of Na Piarsaigh in the final. It was their fifth championship title overall and their third title in succession. It remains their last championship triumph.

References

Limerick Senior Hurling Championship
Limerick Senior Hurling Championship